2013 Vegalta Sendai season.

Players
As of March 5, 2013

Out on loan

2013 Season Transfers

Competitions

J.League

League table

Matches

J.League Cup

Quarterfinal

Emperor's Cup

Quarterfinal

AFC Champions League

Group stage

References

Vegalta Sendai
Vegalta Sendai seasons